Martin Building may refer to:

Martin Building (South San Francisco, California), listed on the National Register of Historic Places in San Mateo County, California
Martin Building (El Paso, Texas), listed on the National Register of Historic Places in El Paso County, Texas

See also
Martin Hall (disambiguation)
Martin Hotel (disambiguation)
Martin House (disambiguation)

Architectural disambiguation pages